John Ed Parchman (born ca. 1949) is an American football coach. He is the head coach at Cisco Junior College since 2006.

High school coaching career 
Parchman coached highly successfully for 20 years in West Texas high school football. As head coach at Frenship High School in Wolfforth, Socorro High School in El Paso, Llano High School in Llano and Lee High School in Midland he amassed a 152-73-1 coaching record.

While at Midland Lee, he compiled an 88-23-1 record in nine years, and led the Rebels with Cedric Benson to three consecutive state championships (1998–2000) in the largest classification. They were the only 5A team in Texas high school football history to “three-peat” until Southlake Carroll High School emulated this feat in 2004-06.

In 1999 Parchman was named National High School Coach of the Year by USA Today.

College coaching career 
After head coaching the Midland Lee Rebels he went to head coach Cisco Junior College football. The Cisco Wranglers finished 7-4 in 2005 with a Southwest Junior College Football co-championship and won the Champs Heart of Texas Bowl against Dodge City Community College.

After more than 20 years as a high school head coach, this will be Parchman's first job at the junior college or college level. Parchman, who said he played at Cisco, said the focus of his recruiting will be on West Texas players.

"These kids all have a story and they are all chasing that dream," Parchman said. "I played at Cisco and I emphathise and understand these guys. We are excited about this and we want to do it right. It's in West Texas and I didn't have to leave home."

References

1940s births
Living people
Cisco Wranglers football coaches
Texas Tech Red Raiders football players
High school football coaches in Texas